The 2013–14 South Carolina Gamecocks men's basketball team will represent the University of South Carolina during the 2013–14 college basketball season. The team's head coach is Frank Martin, who is in his second season at South Carolina. The team plays their home games at the Colonial Life Arena in Columbia, South Carolina as a member of the Southeastern Conference.

Before the season

Departures

Recruits

Season

Preseason
Head coach Frank Martin announced the Gamecocks' league schedule on August 20, 2013. The conference schedule was highlighted by trips to Florida, Missouri, Ole Miss, and Tennessee, while playing host to Kentucky, LSU, Florida, and Alabama. The Gamecocks' non-conference schedule was finalized on September 4, 2013. Highlighted by a trip to the annual Diamond Head Classic in Hawaii, the Gamecocks also scheduled games with Oklahoma State (as part of the Big 12/SEC Challenge) and Baylor (as part of the ESPN Hoops Tip-Off Marathon).

The Gamecocks opened their season on November 3 with one exhibition game against USC Aiken, winning 84–72. South Carolina held a 17-point halftime lead but allowed the Pacers to close the gap late.

Roster

Schedule and results
Source:  

|-
!colspan=9 style="background:#73000A; color:#FFFFFF;"| Exhibition

|-
!colspan=9 style="background:#73000A; color:#FFFFFF;"| Non-conference games

|-
!colspan=9 style="background:#73000A; color:#FFFFFF;"| Conference games

|-
!colspan=9 style="background:#73000A; color:#FFFFFF;" | SEC tournament

Honors and awards
 Jaylen Shaw was named AgSouth Athlete of the Week on November 25, 2013.
 Sindarius Thornwell was named SEC Freshman of the Week on January 13, 2014 and on February 17, 2014.
 Sindarius Thornwell was named Wayman Tisdale National Freshman of the Week on February 18, 2014.

References

South Carolina Gamecocks men's basketball seasons
South Carolina
Game
Game